Epimorius prodigiosa is a species of snout moth in the genus Epimorius. It was described by Whalley in 1964, and is known from Peru.

References

Moths described in 1964
Tirathabini
Moths of South America